Don't Touch Me may refer to:

Songs
Don't Touch Me (Jeannie Seely song) a song by Jeannie Seely written by Hank Cochran, covered by Bettye Swann
Don't Touch Me (Busta Rhymes song), see Don't Touch Me (Throw da Water on 'em)
Don't Touch Me (Hazel O'Connor song), N. O'Connor, E. Case 1984
"Sondaeji-ma", Don't Touch Me (Ailee song)
"Don't Touch Me", a song by The Drongos	Mitchell 1982
"Don't Touch Me", a song by Starfighters (band)	Burton, Dennis, Hambly, Young